The 1936 All-Ireland Senior Football Championship Final was the 49th All-Ireland Final and the deciding match of the 1936 All-Ireland Senior Football Championship, an inter-county Gaelic football tournament for the top teams in Ireland.
Seamus O'Malley, a native to Lavalley, Ballinrobe Co.Mayo was captain of the victorious team.
Paddy Munnelly scored a hat-trick as Mayo coasted to an easy victory. Laois's Bill Delaney played with two broken bones in his foot.

Henry Kenny, father of the future Taoiseach Enda Kenny, was on the winning Mayo team.
This was Mayo's first All-Ireland victory.

References

External links

All-Ireland Senior Football Championship Final
All-Ireland Senior Football Championship Final, 1936
All-Ireland Senior Football Championship Finals
Laois county football team matches
Mayo county football team matches